Richard Tesařík (3 December 1915 – 27 March 1967) was a Czechoslovak officer (Major General in 1956) and World War II hero. First commander of infantry platoon in the battle of Sokolovo (1943), later a commander of the tank battalion he fought in the Battle of Kiev (1943) in the battles of Dukla Pass (1944) and Ostrava operation (1945). He was also a Hero of the Soviet Union.

References

Czech generals
Czech people of World War II
Czechoslovak Army officers
1915 births
1967 deaths
Foreign Heroes of the Soviet Union
Czechoslovak military personnel of World War II
Recipients of the Order of Lenin
Recipients of the Czechoslovak War Cross
Recipients of the Order of the White Lion
Recipients of the Silver Cross of the Virtuti Militari
Recipients of the Order of the Crown (Romania)
People from Prague